Edward William Tayler (March 13, 1931 – April 23, 2018) was an American literary scholar.

He was born in Berlin on March 13, 1931, and moved to the United States, where he grew up in Westfield, New Jersey. He received a bachelor's degree from Amherst College and earned a doctorate in English from Stanford University. Tayler joined the faculty of Columbia University in 1960, and was named the Lionel Trilling Professor in the Humanities. He was an awarded a Guggenheim fellowship in 1968. Tayler retired in 1999, although he returned briefly to teach Literature Humanities and a graduate section in the mid 2000s when he was in fair health. He died of heart failure on April 23, 2018, aged 87.

References

External links 

 Finding aid to Edward (“Ted”) Tayler papers at Columbia University. Rare Book & Manuscript Library.

1931 births
2018 deaths
Writers from Berlin
German emigrants to the United States
Amherst College alumni
Stanford University alumni
American philologists
Columbia University faculty
People from Westfield, New Jersey